Banda Eva is a Brazilian music group from Salvador da Bahia. Their current lead singer is Felipe Pezzoni. The group is notable for being home to superstar singer Ivete Sangalo for several years at the start of her career, before she departed on a solo career.

Albums

Studio albums

Live albums

Compilations

Extended plays (EPs)

Live albums

Singles

Other appearances

Musical videos

References

Brazilian musical groups
Musical groups established in 1993
1993 establishments in Brazil